3rd & Bird is a children's animated television series created by Josh Selig. Selig's company, Little Airplane Productions, animated the series and opened a new studio in London to produce it. The show revolves around a community of birds and their adventures. It was broadcast on the BBC's CBeebies channel from 1 July 2008 to 31 July 2010. Described in its initial press release as "a charming new animated series all about community", the show's format generally involves one or more of the characters encountering a problem which must be solved using the social skills which pre-school children must develop in order to make their way in the world.

The show uses an animation style known as "photo-puppetry", in which the animation is created by the use of manipulation of photographs (similarly to Josh Selig's previous venture Wonder Pets).

Characters

Main
Samuel (voiced by Sam Lewis) is the eldest of the Lovebird children, Samuel is a green lovebird. He acts as a role model to his younger sister, Muffin, and often tries to teach her how to be responsible.
Muffin (voiced by Eden Jarrett) is a pink lovebird and Samuel's younger sister. Not yet old enough to fly, she usually rides on Samuel's back. Muffin calls Samuel "Sam'el," Rudy "Udy," and Mr. Beakman "Beaky."
Rudy (voiced by Morgan Gayle) is a cockatoo (despite resembling a cockatiel more closely) and Samuel's best friend. She wears a bracelet of colored beads on her ankle.
Mr. Beakman (voiced by Michael Fenton Stevens) is the children's teacher, a wise but somewhat pompous toucan who frequently acts as the voice of parental authority. He shows an interest in mariachi bands.

Supporting
Mrs. Billingsley (voiced by Anna Nygh) is a New Zealand gardening kiwi and the oldest bird in the treetop community. She wears a sunhat and is incapable of flying, which occasionally causes problems.
Missy (voiced by Charlotte Leslie-Cameron) is a fashionable great blue turaco who speaks with a thick French accent. She refers to Samuel and his friends as "little birds."
Quinn (voiced by Preston Nyman) is a teenage puffin inventor and technical whizz whose creations often feature in the younger birds' activities. The younger birds look up to him. 
Mr. and Mrs. Lovebird (voiced by David Beckford and Candida Gubbins, respectively) are Samuel and Muffin's parents, with Northern English accents. Despite being rarely seen, they care deeply for their children.  Mr Lovebird is the tree's caretaker.
Baby Jordan (voiced by Reiss Lewin) is Mr. Beakman's nephew, who often uses big words like his father. He calls Muffin "Uffin."
Elliot (voiced by George Phillips) is a worm who is friends with Samuel, Muffin, and Rudy.

The cast also includes world champion musical whistler, Michael Barimo, whose whistling accompanies the music of the show.

Episodes
This includes all episodes.

Season 1 (2008–2009)

Season 2 (2009–2010)

Broadcast
In 2009, BBC Worldwide sold the rights of the show to Canadian TV network Treehouse TV. In 2010, Disney Channel bought broadcast rights to the show and aired it on Playhouse Disney. Following the change of the channel name in September 2011 to Disney Junior, the program continued to air and was rolled out to foreign countries including the United States, where it aired dubbed into American English, as well.

Merchandising
In January 2009, BBC Worldwide announced plans to release 3rd & Bird merchandise, including wooden stacking toys, pull along vehicles, play sets and musical instruments, as well as wheeled toys, including trikes, scooters, and ride-ons. The product line was released in spring 2010

Two compact discs featuring the 3rd & Bird theme song (along with many other CBeebies show tracks) were released by CBeebies titled CBeebies: Song Time (2010) and CBeebies: The Album (2012).

DVDs/Books
A DVD titled Bird's The Word! and containing 8 episodes of the series was released in March 2009, accompanied by a series of books tying into the show. A second DVD, Muffin Land!, was released in June 2009.

References

External links

BBC children's television shows
Treehouse TV original programming
2000s American animated television series
2010s American animated television series
2000s American children's television series
2010s American children's television series
2008 American television series debuts
2010 American television series endings
2000s British animated television series
2010s British animated television series
2000s British children's television series
2010s British children's television series
2008 British television series debuts
2010 British television series endings
American children's animated adventure television series
American television shows featuring puppetry
British children's animated adventure television series
British television shows featuring puppetry
English-language television shows
Animated television series about birds
Animated television series about children
CBeebies
American preschool education television series
British preschool education television series
Animated preschool education television series
2000s preschool education television series
2010s preschool education television series
Television series by Little Airplane Productions